Paul Riessler (Rießler) (18651935) was a noted German biblical scholar who has written a number of widely recognized books including Altjüdisches Schrifttum außerhalb der Bibel.

Biography 
Paul Riessler was born 16 September 1865 in Stuttgart, Germany. He died on 16 September 1935 in Tübingen, Germany.

Bibliography 

His first translation of the Old Testament was published in 1924.

References

External links 

 

1865 births
1935 deaths
Writers from Stuttgart
German biblical scholars